Knight Cornelis de Graeff (19 May 1650 in The Hague – 16 October 1678 in The Hague) was a Dutch nobleman and a water board member of the Zijpe and Haze Polder.

Biography 
He was a member of the family De Graeff and was the only survived son of Andries de Graeff and Elisabeth Bicker van Swieten, both from powerful patrician families of Amsterdam. Johan de Witt was a cousin of him. Cornelis de Graeff grew up in The Hague, while his father was Statutory auditor of the Court of Audit of Holland and West-Friesland ("Meester ordinaris van de Rekenkamer van Holland en West-Friesland"). After he studied law at the University of Leiden he married in 1675 to Agneta Deutz (1657–1678), daughter of Jean Jan Deutz and Geertruid Bicker, daughter of Jan Bicker and Agneta de Graeff van Polsbroek, herself a full aunt of Cornelis. His brother-in-law Jean Jan Deutz, Vrijheer van Assendelft was married to Maria Boreel, member of an outstanding family. The married couple inhabited the city palace Huis van der Graeff, in the middle of the Gouden Bocht block in Amsterdam, at what is now Herengracht 446. In 1677 he was styled as a Free Imperial Knight of the Holy Roman Empire. Cornelis and his father Andries said, that they descent from the Austrian noble family House of Graben von Stein, which was an apparent (or illegitimate) branch of the House of Meinhardin. That diplome dadet from 19 July 1677. Diplom loaned to Mr. Andries de Graeff and his son Cormelis, 19 July 1677:
 "Fide digis itegur genealogistarum Amsteldamensium edocti testimoniis te Andream de Graeff [Andries de Graeff] non paternum solum ex pervetusta in Comitatu nostro Tyrolensi von Graben dicta familia originem ducere, qua olim per quendam ex ascendentibus tuis ejus nominis in Belgium traducta et in Petrum de Graeff [Pieter Graeff], abavum, Johannem [Jan Pietersz Graeff], proavum, Theodorum [Dirck Jansz Graeff], avum, ac tandem Jacobum [Jacob Dircksz de Graeff], patrem tuum, viros in civitate, Amstelodamensi continua serie consulatum scabinatus senatorii ordinis dignitabitus conspicuos et in publicum bene semper meritos propagata nobiliter et cum splendore inter suos se semper gessaerit interque alios honores praerogativasque nobilibus eo locorum proprias liberum venandi jus in Hollandia, Frisiaque occidentale ac Ultrajectina provinciis habuerit semper et exercuerit."

Cornelis de Graeff died after a banquet on the occasion of the Peace of Nijmegen and one day after his father. His tomb chapel is to be found of at the Oude Kerk in Amsterdam. Cornelis de Graeff was painted by famous artists like Gerard ter Borch and Jürgen Ovens.

Gallery

Notes

External links 

 Joost van den Vondels poem Op de kinders van Andries de Graeff en Elisabeth Bicker van Swieten. p 95

1650 births
1678 deaths
Cornelis, Graeff de
Nobility from The Hague
17th-century Dutch people